Soccer Mania, known in Japan as , is a soccer-themed sports simulation video game for the Nintendo Game Boy. It was released in 1990 in Japan and two years later in North America. The two releases differ slightly: in Soccer Mania, the player plays as the USA team, while in Soccer Boy, the player plays as the Japan team.

Gameplay 
The player plays as either the USA team (in Soccer Mania) or the Japan team (in Soccer Boy) with the goal of defeating the other countries in a game of soccer: Brazil, Great Britain, West Germany (known as FRG / Federal Republic of Germany in-game), France, and either Japan, if playing Soccer Mania, or USA, if playing Soccer Boy. One player of the team is controlled at a time, with the view of the game focusing on wherever the ball is on the field. 

A two-player mode exists where two people can play against each other utilizing the Game Boy's Link Cable functionality.

References 

1990 video games
Association football video games
Game Boy games
Game Boy-only games
Epic/Sony Records games
Multiplayer and single-player video games
Video games developed in Japan